The 1977 All-SEC football team consists of American football players selected to the All-Southeastern Conference (SEC) chosen by various selectors for the 1977 NCAA Division I football season.

Offensive selections

Receivers 

 Wes Chandler, Florida (AP-1, UPI)
Martin Cox, Vanderbilt (AP-1)
Dave Trosper, Kentucky (AP-2)
Carlos Carson, LSU (AP-2)

Tight ends

Ozzie Newsome, Alabama (AP-1, UPI)
Curtis Weathers, Ole Miss (AP-2)

Tackles 

 Robert Dugas, LSU (AP-1, UPI)
Jim Bunch, Alabama (AP-1, UPI)
Mark Trogdon, Miss St.(AP-2)
Brent Watson, Tennessee (AP-2)

Guards 
Tom Dornbrook, Kentucky (AP-1)
Lynn Johnson, Auburn (AP-1)
Craig Duhe, LSU (UPI)
George Collins, Georgia (UPI)

Centers 
Robert Shaw, Tennessee (AP-2, UPI)
Dwight Stephenson, Alabama (AP-1)

Quarterbacks 

 Derrick Ramsey, Kentucky (AP-1, UPI)
Jeff Rutledge, Alabama (AP-2)

Halfbacks 

Charles Alexander, LSU (College Football Hall of Fame) (AP-1, UPI)
Tony Green, Florida (AP-2, UPI)
Tony Nathan, Alabama (AP-2)

Fullbacks
Johnny Davis, Alabama (AP-1, UPI)

Defensive selections

Ends 
Art Still, Kentucky (AP-1, UPI)
George Plasketes, Ole Miss (AP-1, UPI)
Wayne Hamilton, Alabama (AP-2)
John Adams, LSU (AP-2)

Tackles 
Larry Gillard, Miss. St. (AP-1, UPI)
Ronnie Swoopes, Georgia (AP-1)
Dennis Harrison, Vanderbilt (UPI)
Marty Lyons, Alabama (AP-2)
Jerry Blanton, Kentucky (AP-2)

Middle guards
Scott Hutchinson, Florida (AP-1, UPI)
Richard Jaffe, Kentucky (AP-2)

Linebackers 
Ben Zambiasi, Georgia (AP-1, UPI)
Freddie Smith, Auburn (AP-1, UPI)
Scot Brantley, Florida (AP-1, UPI)
Ed Smith, Vanderbilt (AP-1)
Kem Coleman, Ole Miss (AP-2)
Charlie Williams, Florida (AP-2)
Barry Krauss, Alabama (AP-2)

Backs 
Mike Siganos, Kentucky (AP-1, UPI)
Bill Krug, Georgia (AP-2, UPI)
Dallas Owens, Kentucky (AP-1)
James McKinney, Auburn  (AP-1)
Mike Kramer, Alabama (UPI)
Mike Tucker, Alabama (AP-2)
Brenard Wilson, Vanderbilt (AP-2)

Special teams

Kickers
Jorge Portela, Auburn (AP-1, UPI)
Berj Yepremian, Florida (AP-1)

Punters

Jim Miller, Ole Miss (AP-2, UPI)
Craig Colquitt, Tennessee (AP-1)

Key
AP = Associated Press

UPI = United Press International

Bold = Consensus first-team selection by both AP and UPI

See also
1977 College Football All-America Team

References

All-SEC
All-SEC football teams